Akademski sportni klub Primorje, commonly referred to as ASK Primorje or simply Primorje, was a Slovenian football club from Ljubljana. The club was formed in May 1920 and was later dissolved in 1936, when its first team merged into a newly formed SK Ljubljana.

Honours
League
Ljubljana Subassociation League
Winners (2): 1927–28, 1928–29
Runners-up (1): 1931–32

References

Association football clubs established in 1920
1920 establishments in Slovenia
Football clubs in Yugoslavia
Football clubs in Ljubljana
Defunct football clubs in Slovenia
Association football clubs disestablished in 1936